Peter Maxwell, Lord Maxwell QC (1919–1994) was a 20th-century Scottish law lord who served as a Senator of the College of Justice.

Life

He was born in Dumfriesshire on 21 May 1919. He was educated at Wellington College, Berkshire.

In the Second World War, he served with the Argyll and Sutherland Highlanders and afterwards studied law at Balliol College, Oxford, later was called to the Scottish Bar as an advocate in 1951. He served as Sheriff Principal for Dumfries and Galloway from 1970 to 1973, succeeding David Brand. In 1973 he was elected a Senator of the College of Justice.

He served as chairman of the Scottish Law Commission from 1981 to 1988.

He died in Edinburgh on 2 January 1994.

Family

In 1941 he married Alison Readman. They had two sons and two daughters.

References

1919 births
1994 deaths
People from Dumfries and Galloway
Senators of the College of Justice
Alumni of Balliol College, Oxford
British Army personnel of World War II
Argyll and Sutherland Highlanders soldiers